The Ministry of Internal Affairs of Romania is one of the eighteen ministries of the Government of Romania.

From 23 August 1944 to 18 March 1975 the ministry held the title of Minister of Internal Affairs, between 2004 and 2007, held the title of Minister of Administration and Interior, and since April 2007, Minister of Interior and Administrative Reform. In December 2008, the Boc government changed the name back to Ministry of Administration and Interior.

Until 2006, the ministry was housed near Lipscani in Palatul Vama Poştei, built between 1914 and 1926 according to the architect Statie Ciortan's plans. In 2006 the ministry moved into the former building of the Senate on Revolution Square.

Subordinated structures
 Romanian Police
 Romanian Inspectorate for Emergency Situations
 Romanian Border Police
 Romanian Gendarmerie
 Romanian National Archives
 General Directorate for Intelligence and Internal Security
 Anti-Corruption General Directorate
 Grupul Special de Protecţie şi Intervenţie
 Special Aviation Unit
 General Directorate for Passports 
 Directorate for Persons Record and Databases Management

History

List of former ministers

This is a list of Interior ministers from the creation of the Romanian state (1862) to the present day.

Romania used the Julian calendar until 1919, but all dates are given in the Gregorian calendar.

The following party abbreviations are used:

Additionally, the political stance of prime ministers prior to the development of a modern party system is given by C (Conservative), MC (Moderate Conservative), RL (Radical Liberal) and ML (Moderate Liberal). Interim officeholders are denoted by italics. For those who held office multiple times, their rank of service is given by a Roman numeral.

External links
  Official site of the Ministry of Administration and Interior
 
  Official site of the Government of Romania

Internal Affairs
Ministry of Administration and Interior (Romania)
Interior Ministers
Law enforcement in Romania
Romania
1862 establishments in Romania